Tellico Village is an unincorporated planned community, and census-designated place on the western shore of Tellico Reservoir in Loudon County, Tennessee, United States, about  southwest of Knoxville. Its population was 5,791 as of the 2010 census.

Tellico Village is a planned retirement community. Governmental functions are managed by the Tellico Village Property Owners Association.

Demographics

History

The origins of Tellico Village date back to the late 1960s with the plan known as Timberlake, a planned city that would have been located along the shores of the Tellico Reservoir in Loudon, Blount, and Monroe counties, and the communities of Tellico Village, Greenback, and Vonore. The city, would have been able to support a population base of roughly 30,000 residents, and provide employment opportunities with commercial and industrial developments.

Tellico Village was created along the shores of Tellico Lake, which was formed due to the Tennessee Valley Authority (TVA) damming the Little Tennessee River at its confluence with the Tennessee River. Tellico Dam was completed in November 1979 after a long battle, which involved the Endangered Species Act of 1973 and a fish called the snail darter. As part of the project, the TVA acquired additional land above the high water line of the reservoir (Tellico Lake), much of it taken by eminent domain. Part of this additional land was later sold to Cooper Communities, Inc., which established  Tellico Village in 1986.

Amenities
The community has three golf courses and a yacht and country club. The names of the golf courses, like the names of the streets and neighborhoods (each neighborhood within Tellico Village has its own name) are derived from American Indian words and names, mostly Cherokee. These include Toqua, meaning "fish," and Tanasi, which was the name of a town that was the capital of the Cherokee Nation between 1721 and 1730. "Tanasi" is also the word from which the name "Tennessee" was derived.

Postal Service
The postal addresses for the community are Loudon (37774) and Vonore (37885), Tennessee.

Tellico Village did have a branch post office through a More Than Mail! store but the store's Postal service contract was terminated in November 2013. It operated for 15 years.

Shopping
Tellico Village has a Food Lion grocery store and a pharmacy, Preferred Pharmacy. For other shopping residents drive to Loudon, Lenoir City or Vonore.

References

Further reading
 Margaret Lynn Brown, The Wild East: A Biography of the Great Smoky Mountains (Gainesville: The University Press of Florida, 2000).
 William Bruce Wheeler and Michael J. McDonald, TVA and the Tellico Dam 1936-1979: A Bureaucratic Crisis in Post-Industrial America (Knoxville: The University of Tennessee Press, 1986)

External links 

Planned cities in the United States
Census-designated places in Loudon County, Tennessee
Unincorporated communities in Tennessee
Census-designated places in Tennessee
Tennessee Valley Authority